Sybrita, or Subrita or Soubrita (Σούβριτα), or Subritus or Soubritos (Σούβριτος), or Sibyrtus or Sibyrtos (Σίβυρτος), was a town of ancient Crete, 8 M. P. from Eleutherna, and famous for its numerous and beautiful silver coins, which, though some of them belong to a very early period, are fine specimens of a Cretan mint; the types are always connected with the worship of Dionysus or Hermes.

It was the seat of a bishop; no longer a residential bishop, under the name Subrita it remains a titular see of the Roman Catholic Church.

The site of Sybrita is located near modern Thronos.

References

Populated places in ancient Crete
Former populated places in Greece
Ancient Greek archaeological sites in Greece
Archaeological sites in Crete
Catholic titular sees in Europe